Fothergill is a hamlet in Cumbria, England. There is a headland of the same name, Fothergill Head.

References

Hamlets in Cumbria
Allerdale